"I Think She Like Me" is a song by American hip hop recording artist Rick Ross, featuring vocals from American singer Ty Dolla $ign. The hip hop and R&B song was released on January 26, 2017 as the lead single of his ninth studio album Rather You Than Me, with the record labels Maybach Music Group and Epic Records. The song was produced by C-Gutta and J-Pilot.

The song contains a sample of "People Make the World Go Round" by The Stylistics.

Music video
On January 26, 2017 Ross uploaded the music video for "I Think She Like Me" on his YouTube and Vevo account.

Charts

References

2017 singles
2017 songs
Ty Dolla Sign songs
Rick Ross songs
Songs written by Lil' C (record producer)
Songs written by Ty Dolla Sign
Songs written by Rick Ross
Songs written by Thom Bell
Songs written by Linda Creed